Mount Merbabu is a dormant stratovolcano in Central Java province on the Indonesian island of Java. The name Merbabu could be loosely translated as 'Mountain of Ash' from the Javanese combined words; Meru means "mountain" and awu or abu means "ash".

The active volcano Mount Merapi is directly adjacent on its south-east side, while the city of Salatiga is located on its northern foothills. A 1,500m high broad saddle lies between Merbabu and Merapi, the site of the village of Selo, Java and highly fertile farming land.

There are two peaks; Syarif (3,119 m) and Kenteng Songo (3,145 m). Three U-shaped radial valleys extend from the Kenteng Songo summit in northwesterly, northeastly and southeastly directions.

Two known moderate eruptions occurred in 1560 and 1797. The 1797 event was rated 2: Explosive, on the Volcanic Explosivity Index. An unconfirmed eruption may have occurred in 1570.

Geologically recent eruptions originated from a North Northwest-South Southeast fissure system that cut across the summit and fed the large-volume lava flows from Kopeng and Kajor craters on the northern and southern flanks, respectively.

Merbabu can be climbed from several routes originating from the town of Kopeng on the north east sideside, and also from Selo on the southern side. A climb from Kopeng to Kenteng Songo takes between 8 and 10 hours.

An area of 57 km² at the mountain has been declared a national park in 2004.

See also 
 List of volcanoes in Indonesia
 List of Ultras of the Malay Archipelago

References

External links 
 Centre of Volcanology & Geological Hazard Mitigation, Pusat Vulkanologi & Mitigasi Bencana Geologi, Volcanological Survey of Indonesia.

Merbabu
Merbabu
Merbabu, Mount
Merbabu, Mount
National parks of Indonesia
Mount Merapi
Tourist attractions in Central Java
Holocene stratovolcanoes